Colours is a compilation album from Scottish singer-songwriter Donovan. It was released in the United States (Del Rack DRZ 921) in 1991.

History
In the early 1990s, audio engineer Steve Hoffman digitally remixed and remastered ten songs from the original master tapes of Donovan's 1965 Pye Records recordings.  The songs were released as a compilation album entitled Colours, but bore no resemblance to the previous albums of the same title.

Track listing
All tracks by Donovan Leitch, except where noted.

"Catch the Wind" – 2:53
"Colours" – 2:43
"Universal Soldier" (Buffy Sainte-Marie) – 2:11
"Hey Gyp (Dig the Slowness)" – 3:06
"Josie" – 3:24
"Jersey Thursday" – 2:11
"Belated Forgiveness Plea" – 2:54
"Sunny Goodge Street" – 2:54
"Ballad of Geraldine" – 4:40
"The Little Tin Soldier" (Shawn Phillips) – 2:58

External links
 Colours (1991) – Donovan Unofficial Site

1991 compilation albums
Donovan compilation albums